Trial by water can refer to:
 Trial by ordeal
 Castelseprio, the apocryphal Christian story of the trial of Mary and Joseph by water